T. K. Govindarao (Tripunithura Krishnarao Govindarao) was the first Malayali film musician and a Carnatic musician (21 April 1929 – 18 September 2011).

Earlier life 
T. K. Govindarao was a proponent of melody. He was born as the son of Tripunithura Vadakkekkotta Chakkalamutt Pallisserrimadathil Krishnarao and Kamalammal. The first Malayalam film background song Subhaleela in the movie Nirmala was sung by him. The first Malayalam movie duet Paaduka poonkuyile too was sung by him along with P. Leela. He sang only in this movie where the lyrics was by G Sankara Kurup and the score was by P. S. Divakar. He took an initial training under Chembai Vaidhyanatha Bhagavathar and Later became the disciple of Musiri Subrahmanya Iyer and turned to Carnatic Classical Music.

He worked as chief producer at Akasavani Delhi and as producer at Akasavani Chennai. He was the president of Sri Tyagaraja Sangita Vidvat Samajam, Tyagarajapuram, Chennai. He published the works of Thyagarajar, Muthuswamy Dikshitar and Syama Sastri in English with their meaning. He published around 400 krithis of Swathi Thirunal. Very particular that Carnatic Music should be sung with the music of the lyrics understood, he formed a trust for the same named Ganamandhir.

He died at Chennai on 18 September 2011. T. K. Govindarao was awarded the prestigious Sangeetha Kalanidhi award of the Madras Music Academy in the year 1999.

Awards 
 Kendra sangeetha Natak Academy Award (1996)
 Sangeethakalanidhi (1999 - Madras Music Academy)
 Sangita Vidvan (1951 from Central College of Karnatak Music, Madras)
 GanakalaTilaka (Bangalore)
 Sangita Sastra Ratnakara (Bhuvanesvari Pitham)
 Svara Samrat (BM Trust KL)
 Asthana Vidvan from Kanchi Kamakoti Peetham
 Saptagiri Sangita Vidvanmani
 Sangita Samrat (Bharatiya VidyaBhavan CBE)
 Gayaka Sikhamani
 Sangita Chudamani (Sri KrishnaGana Sabha, Chennai)
 Nadakkanal
 Sangita Ratnakara(USA)
 Sangita Acharya
 Central Sangita Nataka Akademi Award
 Sangita Purnasri
 Hanumath GanaSiromani
 Sangita Samrat (Mangalore Sabha)
 Sri Vedavyasa Vidwanmani
 Vivekananda National Award for Excellence
 Kerala Sangita Nataka Akademi Award
 Gandharva Vidyanidhi
 Sangita Paramacharaya
 Sangita Sevanirata

References 

1929 births
Recipients of the Sangeet Natak Akademi Award
Malayalam playback singers
2011 deaths